Xlendi is an urban village in Malta situated in the south west of the island of Gozo. It is surrounded by the villages of Munxar, Fontana and Kerċem. The village is administered by Munxar, but has its own coat of arms and motto. From March 2010, Xlendi has had its own 5-person "mini council" responsible for the main activities of the area.

Etymology
The name Xlendi is of Byzantine origin as it is named after a galley of the period, that was wrecked along the coast, that was called Shilandi. Evidence of this was retrieved near the entry of the bay, at the bottom of the sea, in the 1960s. Since then the site has become a popular diving site.

Historical places

Punic Tombs
Also, tombs dating from Punic-Byzantine times were found in Xlendi, some at St. Simon Point (under St. Simon Street) and some others in Xlendi Valley. Romans used to port in Xlendi as it has features that can protect from the wind for its cliffs around the bay. In the middle of the bay there is a reef which caused many shipwrecks. These sunken ships left a large number of Roman amphorae on the seabed in the mouth of the bay.

Xlendi Tower

The Xlendi Tower guarding the mouth of the bay was built by the Grandmaster Juan de Lascaris-Castellar on 29 June 1650. This was built so pirates or Turks could not launch attacks from this bay. This tower is still standing. It has, until recently, been abandoned with substantial damage caused to the outer walls of the tower. Responsibility for the tower was passed to the Local Council and Din l-Art Ħelwa in 2010. As of August 2020, restoration works were commenced on its outer structure. The Tower was quite important for the British Army in Malta as it was the only tower in the southwest of the island. It was entitled Tower B (secondly in place) to show its importance.

Chapels
It is strange that Xlendi in the middle 17th century had a total of 4 chapels. These were: St Simon Chapel (St Simon Point) which also had a cemetery and when profaned, the bishop ordered that a stone cross should be carved in the rocks; St Domenica which was an underground chapel located roughly on the cliffs over the valley of Xlendi on the side of Munxar and was difficult to reach, so it was profaned soon after it was established; St Catherine was established over Xlendi on the cliffs on the side of the village of Kercem. It was built over a cliff which bears the same name. It is said that there was a small community in the area of this chapel; 'Vizitazzjoni ta' Forn il-Gir' was not much visited by people. It was established between Munxar and Xlendi but very little is known about it. All of these chapels were profaned between the 1650s and the 1680s.

The church, dedicated to Our Lady of Mount Carmel, was dedicated in 1974, but some parts of the building are far older, dating to 1868. Every year, on the first Sunday of September, a feast dedicated to the patron saint is held. In the Afternoon, water games are held at the bay with the traditional '', a greasy pole which the players have to walk on to catch a flag.  In the evening a procession with the statue of Our Lady of Mount Carmel is held around Xlendi.

Underground Emergency Mill

In 1955, the Xlendi mill was excavated into the cliffs, situated behind the Mount Carmel church. This chamber was divided into three floors and housed the storage, grinding and milling equipment. At the rear of the mill is the silo, having a storage capacity of approximately 1,000 tonnes of wheat, and connected to the milling machinery by mechanical augers. An 80 hp diesel engine and alternator supplied power. Entrances from above can also access the silo. The Mill was built when the Cold War was escalating when nuclear conflict was possible. This Mill was nuclear safe. But this mill was never used after being built.

Topography
This village has a great topography with quite steep cliffs on the side and a valley on the back which takes rain water from the villages surrounding it (Kerċem, Munxar, Fontana and Victoria) into the bay.

Xlendi Bay
During the British rule, Xlendi's bay was sandy, but with the passage of time, water from the valley and human interference, it is now pebbly. The bay is still known for the rocks on the left side of the bay which are good for sunbathing and diving.

Valleys

Xlendi Valley starts from Fontana continuing from the Lunzjata Valley and Wied l-Ghawdxija and ends in the bay into the sea. So Xlendi Valley collects almost all the rain that falls on the adjacent villages of Kerċem, Munxar and Fontana. The rain water goes through Xlendi and this is quite a problem for most citizens living in Xlendi because they are isolated by the fast flowing water. This also causes flooding in the buildings on the main road from where the valley water passes. This valley is one of the very few homes to the Maltese Freshwater Crab.

Il-Kantra is a valley on the left of the bay just beside the Tower. The name Kantra derives from Alcantara in Spanish-Sicilian. This is because of the entrance of the valley and the valley's form. From its entrance, it could be seen as a bow. This valley is home to many types of flora and fauna because not many people go there. The Tower of Xlendi was reached by a bridge built by the Knights of Saint John over the Kantra Valley.

Caves

There are many caves, small or large, on the sides of the bay. The main and most known caves are:

Caroline Cave is a cave on the right cliffs of the bay. It was once the property of Caroline Cauchi, a rich woman from Victoria. Later she founded the Augustinian Sisters on Gozo and donated almost all of her land, including the cave and other land in Xlendi. The Sisters during summers started to stay at Xlendi. They would go for a swim in this cave which was isolated and could only be reached by stairs. So they would use this cave as their own and would not be seen by other people in the bay.

Catherine of Siena Cave is situated outside the bay on the right side. It is well known for the very clear blue water. In the 17th century, people used to live in the areas around the cave and built a church just over the cave. So the cave got its name from the saint to which the church was dedicated.

Nature

The undeveloped area around Xlendi is home for a lot of flora and fauna species, some of them rare. One can name the Seagulls, the Maltese Freshwater Crab and the 'Widnet il-Bahar'. Today, Xlendi is one of the most developed areas on the island, a feature that damages the biodiversity in the area. The 3 km stretch of cliffed coastline from Xlendi Bay westwards to Wardija Point forms the Xlendi Bay to Wardija Point Cliffs Important Bird Area, identified as such by BirdLife International because of its importance for two species of breeding shearwaters.

Notable people
Caroline Cauchi

Roads in Xlendi

Pjazza l-Anfori (Anfori Square)
Triq il-Qsajjam (Separation Street)
Triq Ġdida fi Triq il-Qsajjam (New Street inside Separation Street)
Triq ir-Rabat (Victoria Road)
Triq Ras il-Bajjada (Painter's Head Road)
Triq San Xmun (St Simon Road)
Triq il-Biżantini (Byzantine Street)
Triq ir-Rumani (Romans Street)
Triq il-Puniċi (Punic Street)
Triq it-Torri (Tower Street)
Triq il-Kantra (Kantra Street)
Triq il-Kavallieri (Knights Street)
Triq iż-Żirżieb (Slippery Street)
Triq l-Għar ta' Karolina (Caroline Cave Street)
Triq is-Sienja (Sienja Street)
Triq ir-Ranċis (Rancis (a flower) Street)
Triq il-Qroll (Coral Street)
Triq tal-Karmnu (Our Lady of Mount Carmel Street)
Triq ix-Xlendi (Xlendi Street)
Triq is-Sajjieda (Fishers' Street)
Triq Sant' Indrija (Saint Andrew Street)

References

Populated places in Malta
Gozo
Munxar